Engel Michielszoon de Ruyter (2 May 1649 – 27 February 1683) was a Dutch vice-admiral.

Biography
De Ruyter was born in Vlissingen, the son of lieutenant admiral Michiel de Ruyter and his second wife Cornelia Engels. He began his naval service on board his father's ship on his expeditions in 1664 and 1665. Captains often had their sons serve with them, so that they learned their trade while their wages were paid by the Admiralty. In 1666, during the Second Anglo-Dutch War, Engel was a midshipman in the Admiralty of Amsterdam. He served in the St. James's Day Battle on board Willem van der Zaen's ship, the Gouda. In 1667 he rose to lieutenant-commander. On 1 April 1668 he became captain-extraordinary and in 1669 a captain in ordinary, a permanent post. In 1670 he served under lieutenant-admiral Willem Joseph van Ghent in the expedition against the privateers of Algiers, receiving a reward for his service on that expedition. 

During the Third Anglo-Dutch War he fought in the battle of Solebay as captain of the Deventer and was wounded in the chest by a splinter. In the winter of 1672/73 he also commanded a company of "landmatrozen" on the Dutch Water Line as a major. In 1673 he was captain of the Waesdorp in the two battles at the Schooneveld and at the Battle of Texel. His change of command was lucky, since the Deventer went out of service after an accident in the First Battle of the Schooneveld. On 6 October 1673 he was promoted to schout-bij-nacht. During the Franco-Dutch War he was on the 70-gun Spieghel in 1674 during the failed expedition against Martinique. In 1675 he served on convoy escort duty in the Mediterranean and in 1676 he fought in the fleet sent to help Denmark against the Swedes in the Scanian War. On 19 October 1678 he was made vice-admiral and commanded a squadron in the fleet under Cornelis Evertsen de Jonge which was sent to help Spain, fighting the French admiral Chateaurenault.

Not as grave as his father, Engel commissioned a biography of him from Gerard Brandt in 1681 and made his father's logbooks more accessible by writing summaries of them. Like his father, he was promoted within the Danish and Spanish nobility, rising to junker and later baron - in the Netherlands he was also known as ridder. In 1680 he bought an estate in Breukelen, naming it the Ruytervegt. He never married and died childless.

1649 births
1683 deaths
17th-century Dutch military personnel
Admirals of the navy of the Dutch Republic
Dutch naval personnel of the Anglo-Dutch Wars
People from Vlissingen